Take It to the Limit is the tenth studio album by American musician Norman Connors, released in 1980 on Arista Records.

Critical reception 

Andy Kellman of AllMusic cited that the singles from Take It to the Limit rightfully deserved their modest success. He continued, "...but a small clutch of other gems deserved similar achievements. "I Don't Need Nobody Else," sung by Al Johnson, sparkles brightly, while Adaritha's "Justify" is just as gorgeous as the album's hit singles. One minor disappointment is Leon Ware's set-closing "Everywhere Inside of Me," which falls toward the sappy side. One major dud is a plonking cover of Steely Dan's "Black Cow", which has inexplicably shown up on a number of Connors anthologies. Six out of eight ain't bad by any stretch."

Chart performance 
The album peaked at number 145 on the Billboard Top LPs chart and number 30 on the Billboard Top Soul LPs chart. The singles from the album "Take It To The Limit" and "Melancholy Fire" charted and peaked at number 28 and number 20, respectively, on the Billboard R&B chart.

Track listing 
Side one

Side Two

2013 remaster bonus tracks

Charts

Personnel 

The album features several guest musical acts courtesy of their respective record labels.

Columbia Records: Adaritha – vocals, Al Johnson – arrangements & vocals, Freddie Hubbard – flugelhorn and Starship Orchestra – instrumentation

Philadelphia International Records: Jean Carn, The Jones Girls – vocals

Savoy Records: Glenn Jones – vocals

Elektra / Asylum Records: Leon Ware – vocals

Other musicians

 Norman Connors – drums, percussion, vocals
 Alex Brown, Eric Butler, Gwen Matthews, Jim Gilstrap, Marlene Jeter, Vanetta Fields – backing vocals
 David T. Walker, Marlo Henderson – guitar
 Billy McCoy, Bobby Lyles, Sonny Burke – keyboard
 Nathan East, Byron Miller – bass
 James Gadson – drums
 Myungo, Paulinho Da Costa – percussion
 Dorothy Ashby – harp
 Allen Robinson, Sidney Muldrow – french Horn
 Don Myrick, John Kip, Ralph Jones, Bill Green – Saxophone
 Gary Bartz – soprano saxophone, soloist
 Buzzy Jones – tenor saxophone
 Garnet Brown, George Bohanon – trombone
 Bobby Bryant, Eric Butler, Nolan Smith, Oscar Brashear – trumpet

Production

 Ron Averez, Jackson Schwartz – engineer
 Norman Connors, Jean Carn, Gerald Roberts – producer
 John Golden – mastering
 Tony Barboza, Garry Gross – photography
 Donn Davenport – art direction
 Norman Connors – director
 Harry Bluestone – concertmaster (strings)
 Ben Barrett – contractor (strings)
 George Bohanon – contractor (horns)

References 

1980 albums
Norman Connors albums